Middlesex University Dubai (MDX Dubai) is an offshore campus of Middlesex University London in Dubai, United Arab Emirates. Situated across two locations in Dubai Knowledge Park and Dubai International Academic City, the campus was inaugurated in 2005 and currently has over 4,500 students from over 110 studying across both locations. Dr Cedwyn Fernandes is Director of Middlesex University Dubai, alongside his duties as Pro-Vice Chancellor of Middlesex University London.

Middlesex University's student body has over 37,000 students from more than 140 nationalities.

History
Middlesex University opened its first overseas branch campus – Middlesex University Dubai in 2005. It is a private university located in Dubai, United Arab Emirates. It is the first overseas campus of Middlesex University London (UK).

The university campus is located in Dubai Knowledge Village as part of Dubai's Technology and Media Free Zone. This is a joint venture with Middlesex Associates, a business consortium in Dubai. The campus was the first Middlesex campus outside North London. It provides courses in Accounting and Finance, Business and Management, Computing and IT, Education, Law and Politics, Marketing, Media and Communications, Psychology, Social Science and International Tourism Management.

The university offers a wide range of foundation, undergraduate and postgraduate programmes across both its Dubai campuses, including: Accounting and Finance, Business and Management, Marketing, Computer Engineering, IT, Data Science, Robotics, Education, Psychology, Law, Digital Media, Film, Creative Writing and Journalism, Digital Media, Fashion Design, and Graphic Design. 

The campus is licensed by Dubai Knowledge and Human Authority (KHDA), and its programmes are approved by the KHDA. In August 2009, KHDA's University Quality Assurance International Board (UQAIB) commended the quality of university's programmes.

MDX Dubai was recognised by KHDA as Dubai’s largest UK university for a second consecutive year as of 2022, with over 4,500 students from over 118 nationalities. Middlesex University Dubai received a 5-Star KHDA rating for the quality of its education and overall student experience in 2020, followed by a second in 2022. 

In 2017, the university hosted the EU and UAE conference regarding the Rule of Law and Arbitration, where the Head of Delegation of the European Union to the United Arab Emirates, along with the legal director of Clyde & Co and the head of advocacy of Taylor Wessing were present.

In August 2019, the university was chosen to be a partner of the PRCA in the Middle East and North Africa region.

Timeline
The history of Middlesex University began during the 1880s, when two colleges, St Katherine's College and the Hornsey School of Arts and Crafts, started operations in north London. Both eventually became a part of Middlesex Polytechnic, which was later founded in 1973. Middlesex was awarded the title ‘University’ by Royal Assent in 1992. The university opened its global branch campuses in Dubai in 2005 and Mauritius in 2010.

Location
Middlesex University Dubai operates two campuses in Dubai. The university’s main campus is located in Dubai Knowledge Park. Dubai Knowledge Park was established in the year 2003. The university opened its second campus location in Dubai International Academic City in September 2021.

Programs Offered

School of Business 

BA Honours Accounting and Finance
BSc Honours Business Accounting
BA Honours Business Management
BA Honours Business Management (Supply Chain and Logistics)
BA Honours Business Management (Innovation & Entrepreneurship)
BA Honours Business Management (Project Management)
BA Honours Business Management (Human Resources)
BA Honours Business Management (Finance)
BA Honours Business Management (Marketing)
BA Honours International Business
BSc Honours International Tourism Management
BA Honours Marketing
MBA (All Pathways)
MSc Banking and Finance
MSc Investment Management
MA Human Resource Management and Development
MA International Business Management
MSc Corporate and Marketing Communications
MSc Digital Marketing & Analytics
MSc Strategic Marketing
MSc International Hospitality & Events Management

School of Accounting & Finance 

BA Honours Accounting and Finance
BSc Honours Business Accounting
Postgraduate taught courses
MSc Investment Management
MSc Banking and Finance

School of Law 

LLB Honours Law
LLB Honours Law with International Relations
LLB Honours Commercial Law
LLB Honours Law with Criminology
MA International Relations
MA Global Governance and Sustainable Development
LLM in International Business Law
LLM in International Law
LLM Law

School of Science and Technology 

BSc Honours Information Technology
BSc Honours Business Information Systems
BEng Honours Computer Systems Engineering
BEng Honours Electronic Engineering
BSc Honours Psychology with Human Resource Management
BSc Honours Psychology with Counselling Skills
BSc Honours Psychology with Marketing
BSc Honours Psychology with Education
BSc Honours Psychology with Criminology
MSc Engineering Management
MSc Network Management and Cloud Computing
MSc Robotics
MSc Business Information Systems Management (BISM)
MSc Data Science
MSc Cyber Security and Pen Testing
MSc Applied Psychology

School of Health and Education 

BA Honours Early Childhood Studies
BA Honours Education Studies
MA Education (Leadership Management)
MA Education (Teaching and Learning)
MA Education SEND (Special Education Needs and Disability) pathway
Postgraduate Certificate in Higher Education (PGCertHE)
MA Higher Education

School of Art and Design 

BA Honours Fashion Design
BA Honours Graphic Design
Postgraduate taught courses
MA Graphic Design

School of Media 

BA Honours Creative Writing and Journalism
BA Honours Advertising, PR and Branding
BA Honours Film
BA Honours Digital Media

Accreditation 
The Middlesex University Dubai is licensed by the Knowledge and Human Development Authority (KHDA) belonging to the government of Dubai. It was awarded a 5 Star rating in the 2020 KHDA Higher Education Classification. It is audited by the UK's Quality Assurance Agency (QAA) for Higher Education. Academic programmes in the Middlesex Dubai campus have the same validation and monitoring system as the parent university.

References 

Middlesex University
Universities and colleges in Dubai
2005 establishments in the United Arab Emirates